Franco Ferrini (born 5 January 1944) is an Italian screenwriter. His works often fall into the genres of horror  or thriller. He was one of the interviewees represented in the book Spaghetti Nightmares.

Select filmography

References

Sources

Bibliography

External links
 

1944 births
Living people
Italian screenwriters
People from La Spezia
Giallo film directors
Italian male screenwriters